Martin Rundkvist (born 4 April 1972) is a Swedish archaeologist and associate professor at the University of Łódź in Poland. His research focuses on the Bronze, Iron, and Middle Ages of Scandinavia, including significant excavations in the province of Östergötland.

Rundkvist has studied and excavated various sites in Sweden, particularly in the country's south. A subsequent book identified nine possible regional power centres in Östergötland, and attempted to determine where the "Beowulfian mead halls" of the day once stood. Excavating years later at one of these sites, Rundkvist uncovered the foundations of a large mead hall, and 30 ornate gold figures that might have represented gods or royals. In other works, Rundkvist has excavated a Viking boat grave, and analysed both the placement of deposited artefacts in the landscape and the lifestyles of the Scandinavian élite  during the Middle Ages.

Rundkvist has worked in archaeology since 1992, including research and lecture posts at the universities of Exeter, Chester, Linnaeus, and Tallinn. Rundkvist served as chair for the Swedish Skeptics' Association for four years, and edited its quarterly magazine .

Early life and education 

Martin Rundkvist was born on 4 April 1972 in Stockholm, Sweden, to Åsa Leander and Pelle Rundkvist. Other than living in Connecticut from 1976 to 1978 while his father worked in advertising at Young & Rubicam in New York, Rundkvist has spent his entire life in Stockholm. As a teenager in the 1980s, he played role-playing games and spent time on online bulletin board systems. Rundkvist graduated with a Bachelor of Arts from Stockholm University in 1992, and received his PhD from the same institution in 2003. In 2001, Rundkvist won several games on the Swedish version of the television show Jeopardy!. That same year, he gave a public talk on J. R. R. Tolkien's Middle-earth and its connection to archaeology.

Career 
Rundkvist has held archaeological positions since 1992; these were primarily research-related, but included contract work. Among these were positions as an honorary researcher at the University of Exeter from 2005 to 2008, as a project leader, field archaeologist, and artefact specialist for Värmdö Municipality from 2007 to 2008, and as a visiting researcher at the University of Chester from 2008 to 2015. Howard Williams, an archaeologist at Chester, said that Rundkvist's appointment "augments our international research expertise in early medieval archaeology, and we foresee a range of advantages for collaborative research and fieldwork opportunities for students in Viking Age archaeology". Rundkvist was a senior lecturer at Linnaeus University starting in 2012, and at Umeå University starting in autumn 2013. In 2014 he began working as a collaborator at Tallinn University's Institute of History. He joined the faculty at the University of Łódź's Institute of Archaeology in January 2020, and as of 2021 is an associate professor there.

Rundkvist has held a variety of positions with academic journals. From April 1999 to November 2018, he was the managing editor of the quarterly —the Journal of Swedish Antiquarian Research—published by the Royal Swedish Academy of Letters, History and Antiquities. Rundkvist wrote that he joined partly to gain "a better platform in academic archaeology than the shaky one I had as a PhD student", and stayed in part because "the Royal Academy of Letters is a very good employer and takes care of its people".

From 2006 to 2012, Rundkvist served as the Scandinavian correspondent for Antiquity. He also served as a referee for the journal, and for the International Journal of Osteoarchaeology, In Situ Archaeologica, Norwegian Archaeological Review, and the Estonian Journal of Archaeology. He has kept an influential blog since at least 2006, first titled "Salto Sobrius", and now known as Aardvarchaeology; it has been termed by the James Randi Educational Foundation as "the most-read archaeology blog on the Internet", and by Archaeology as a "quirky and popular Swedish blog" with "an opinionated perspective on scientific archaeology with a particular focus on Scandinavia".

Rundkvist has frequently featured in the news media. In 2011, Sweden's national newspaper  and other outlets repeatedly covered a controversy between Rundkvist and the amateur archaeologist Bob Lind about excavations at the Ale's Stones stone ship, with Rundkvist noting that Lind's theories of the Stones' date and use were at odds with the scientific consensus. Speaking to Live Science, Rundkvist said that the stones were likely a grave marker from "the world of Beowulf". Rundkvist participated in Curators of Sweden in 2016, handling the country's official Twitter account, @Sweden, for what he termed a "geeky, pun-ridden and bookish" week. The following year, he appeared in a debate in  about the low level of thematically relevant training among Sweden's museum directors. Rundkvist had attracted attention as far back as 2002 for criticising Swedish History Museum director , whom he called "a non-archaeologist whose attitude to the museum placed in his care may be summarised as politically expedient, instrumental and post-modernist".

Research 

Rundkvist's research focuses on the Bronze through Middle Ages in Scandinavia. His PhD dissertation—Barshalder 1. A Cemetery in Grötlingbo and Fide Parishes, Gotland, Sweden, c. A companion volume, Barshalder 2, included essays placing the site in its wider context, and the following year Barshalder 3 detailed the Stone Age finds from the site. The topic was suggested by Jan Peder Lamm, who discovered important unpublished finds from the cemetery while organising the Swedish History Museum's stores, and declared that it would take "a foolish and stubborn person" to gather and publish the artefacts and notes from nearly two centuries of excavation. The works were reviewed in Antiquity as "a good thorough contextual study", and noted for offering "an elegant explanation" for clustered Viking Age graves, which Rundkvist argued represented grandparents and their grandchildren rather than a nuclear family.

In 2005, Rundkvist and Williams directed the excavation of a Viking boat grave at Skamby, in the province of Östergötland. The site's surface features suggested a cemetery comprising ten boat graves, making it exceptional for the area. The excavation was the first of a boat burial in Östergötland. Widely reported in the media, the dig uncovered 23 rare amber gaming pieces, the first time such pieces had been found in the country since the excavation of a grave at Birka more than a century before. Rundkvist and Williams published a paper on the finds in 2008. Two years later, Rundkvist published a widely cited paper on Scandinavian domed oblong brooches from the Vendel Period. The article catalogued nearly 600 such brooches, as well as transitional types through to the Early Viking Age, and was termed "comprehensive" by the Danish archaeologist . The work was also praised by the Swedish archaeologist Birgitta Hårdh for demonstrating, among other things, how Uppåkra functioned as an innovation centre for new types of fibulae.

In 2011, Rundkvist published a fourth book, Mead-halls of the Eastern Geats. It analysed the regional political geography of Östergötland, and attempted to identify the region's "Beowulfian mead halls", the large buildings that housed the Late Iron Age élite. Interviewed by Ancient History Encyclopedia, Rundkvist said he chose to focus on Östergötland "mainly because little had been done about 1st millennium CE elite culture there". Rundkvist ultimately identified nine areas as regional power centres, where mead halls may have stood, during parts of the Late Roman Period through Viking Age.

Rundkvist's fifth book, In the Landscape and Between Worlds: Bronze Age Deposition Sites Around Lakes Mälaren and Hjälmaren in Sweden, was published in 2015. It analysed sites around lakes Mälaren and Hjälmaren where Bronze Age metalwork and stone implements had been found outside of burial and settlement contexts, and sought to identify traits that could be used to find new deposition sites. Given the region's comparatively humble finds, and the diffuse nature of Rundkvist's landscape descriptions—such as to look for where water "does something interesting"—several reviewers wrote that it would be difficult to translate his heuristic principles to the field, as intended; one termed it a "curate's egg". Writing in Landscapes, Mike Parker Pearson called it "a joy to read and a valuable regional synthesis for understanding the landscape context of votive deposition in the European Bronze Age".

Rundkvist's 2019 book At Home at the Castle, and its 2020 Swedish translation , were published by the Östergötland County Administrative Board. It built on Rundkvist's two decades of fieldwork in the area, including excavations of four of its twenty-five castles, and marked his entry into "the historically documented part of our province's past". Accordingly, one reviewer wrote that it "fluently combines archaeological evidence and historical textual sources". The work analysed the lifestyles of those who lived in castles in Östergötland around 1200–1530 AD; modifying a common saying about World War I, Rundkvist termed such existence "decades of boredom punctuated by weeks of terror". Several reviewers suggested the book worked better for a non-technical than an academic audience, though one termed it a "work of synthesis" that "puts into international reach some recent archaeological work on castles" in Östergötland. Another wrote that the book was full of "small but enlightening chapters" and that it "conducts researchers and other readers to an archaeological trip through the Swedish castles alongside the margins of the Baltic Sea".

In 2021, Rundkvist published a seventh book, an annotated English translation of the writings of the Swedish explorer . The son of a priest and illegitimate grandson of the Queen's brother, Kiöping had written about his travels from 1648 to 1656 along the coasts of Africa, Arabia and southern Asia, and an autobiographical essay first published posthumously in 1773.

Aska mead hall 

In his 2011 work on mead halls, he had termed Aska one of "the best candidates for elite settlements". The mound, they determined, was a platform for the hall. Quoted in Archaeology, Rundkvist compared the hall to other contemporaneous élite sites in Fornsigtuna and Lejre, and particularly Gamla Uppsala.

In the summers of 2020 and 2021, Rundkvist returned to Aska to excavate the platform which, other than trial trenches dug in 1985 and 1986, remained unexcavated. The dig uncovered part of the foundations of the mead hall from around 700 AD, including post holes, and artefacts such as two whale-bone gaming pieces, an iron pendant, flint flakes used to make fires, and a decorative Vendel Period shield mount. The excavations also uncovered around 30 stamped gold foil figures, or guldgubbar. Speaking to Sveriges Television, Rundkvist described it as only the third find of such figures in Östergötland, and said they may have represented the gods or royals; they may originally have been attached to support posts or high seats.

In September 2020, several weeks after the initial excavation of the mead hall, Rundkvist led a metal-detector survey of the West Cemeteries at Aska, where the rich burial had been found 100 years earlier, and the East Cemetery, discovered near the platform mound in 2006. Their survey reported finds to the west, suggesting the presence of both a settlement site and burials, including five brooches from the Early Vendel Period and fragmented copper-alloy jewellery from the Middle Viking Age. To the east, the survey reported further finds from the Vendel and Viking periods, along with an undisturbed inhumation, which they left for future excavation.

Swedish Skeptics' Association
Rundkvist has been active in the skeptical movement, having chaired the Swedish Skeptics' Association and edited its quarterly . He joined the organisation in 1997, and immediately began writing for its journal. In 2002, he became an editor of the journal, and two years later he joined the association's executive board. From 2011 to 2014, he served as its chair, appearing in the press as a skeptic of perceived pseudoscience.

Awards and distinctions 
In 2020, the Royal Swedish Academy of Letters, History and Antiquities awarded Rundkvist the Academy's Antiquary Award in Silver "for many years of service and valuable editorship for the Academy journal Fornvännen".

Selected publications

Books

Other 
 
 Republished in part as

References

Primary

Secondary

Bibliography

External links 
Former personal web site
Aardvarchaeology, Rundkvist's personal blog

1972 births
Living people
Swedish archaeologists
Academic staff of the University of Łódź
Swedish bloggers
Science bloggers
Swedish skeptics
Stockholm University alumni
Scientists from Stockholm